A ship and a shore establishment of the Royal Navy have borne the name HMS Sherwood:

  was named HMS Sherwood while in service with the Royal Navy (1940–1945)
  is a Royal Naval Reserve facility that was commissioned in 1984

Royal Navy ship names